Maria Christina Henriette Desideria Felicitas Raineria of Austria (21 July 1858 – 6 February 1929) was the second queen consort of Alfonso XII of Spain. She was queen regent during the vacancy of the throne between her husband's death in November 1885 and the birth of their son Alfonso XIII in May 1886, and subsequently also until the coming of age of the latter in May 1902.

Early life
Known to her family as Christa, she was born at Židlochovice Castle (Groß Seelowitz), near Brünn (now Brno), in Moravia, a daughter of Archduke Karl Ferdinand of Austria and his wife, Archduchess Elisabeth Franziska of Austria.

Her paternal grandparents were Archduke Charles of Austria and Princess Henriette Alexandrine of Nassau-Weilburg.

Various sources attributed good traits to Maria Christina before her marriage. One states she was "tall, fair, sensible, and well educated". She was Princess-Abbess of the Theresian Royal and Imperial Ladies Chapter of the Castle of Prague (1875-1879).

Queen consort

After the death of Queen María de las Mercedes in June 1878, King Alfonso XII was determined to remarry to produce an heir. The Queen had died just a few months after her marriage with no descendants and negotiations started with the court of Vienna. In August, Alfonso XIII traveled to Arcachon, Gironde, with the specific purpose of meeting Archduchess Maria Christina and her mother Archduchess Elisabeth. In this first meeting, the King proposed to her and she accepted. 

In early September 1878, the Spanish Government approved the engagement and Emperor Franz Joseph asked his niece to officially relinquish her title of Abbess of the Theresian Convent of Prague as it was necessary for the future queen to abandon all her Austrian appointments. The proposal was gazetted in the Wiener Zeitung on 7 September: "His Majesty the King of Spain, during his visit to Archacon, has requested the hand of the Most Serene Lady Archduchess Maria Christina... with previous consent of His Imperial and Royal Apostolic Majesty, as Chief of the Imperial Family, the Most Serene Lady Archduchess has accepted the said proposal". 

In compliance with Article 56 of the Constitution, the Cortes passed a law granting a 500.000 pesetas annuity for the future queen consort on 2 November. The terms of the marriage were settled in an agreement executed between Austria and Spain in Vienna on 15 November by their respective plenipotentiaries. That same day Maria Christina renounced to her succession rights to the Austrian throne before the Emperor and the court according to the tradition imposed to the archduchesses who were to marry a foreign prince. Another marriage agreement was signed in Madrid on 28 November by the King and Maria Christina themselves.

The wedding took place on 29 November 1879 at the Basilica of Atocha in Madrid. The arranged marriage (the second of Alfonso XII after the death of his first wife María de las Mercedes of Orléans), was concerted on the basis of the conservative profile espoused by the Austro-Hungarian Empire as well as by the prestige attained by the Habsburgs in their previous involvement in the history of Spain, and blocked the possibility of a prospective Austrian endorsement to the Carlist cause.

After giving birth to two female children—María de las Mercedes (born 1880) and María Teresa (born 1882)—she ensured dynastic continuity, yet, with the threatening landmark for the ruling dynasty set by the previous Carlist Wars, she was still pressured to undergo a new pregnancy and give birth to a male child in order to consolidate the political system, as it was considered at the time.

She became pregnant again before the death of her husband in November 1885 (the king suffered from tuberculosis yet he led an active life). An attributed dying wish by Alfonso XII pleading to her is "Ya verás cómo todo se arregla providencialmente. Pero, si muero, guarda el coño y ándate siempre de Cánovas a Sagasta y de Sagasta a Cánovas" ("You will see how everything is going to be providentially fixed, yet if I die, keep your pussy at bay and always go from Cánovas to Sagasta and from Sagasta to Cánovas"). While possibly apocryphal, it is representative of the Restoration era. Months later, in May 1886, she would give birth to a male child, Alfonso, who reigned as Alfonso XIII upon his birth.

Regency 

Designated as regent upon the death of her husband in 1885, Maria Christina swore on the 1876 Constitution on 30 December 1885 at the Palacio de las Cortes, before the two legislative bodies. She rejected the title of reina gobernadora ("Queen Governor"), distancing from the memory of the previous regent Maria Christina of Bourbon-Two Sicilies, who had used it in the 1830s.

When the King died on 25 November 1885, Maria Christina was pregnant, so the throne was vacant, depending on whether Maria Christina's unborn child was a male or a female; a male would make that child king, while a female would place the elder daughter and Princess of Asturias, María de las Mercedes, on the throne. During this period, Maria Christina ruled as regent until her child Alfonso, a son, was born on 17 May 1886; he was King (Alfonso XIII) from birth.

She nurtured a persona of austerity and staidness, and became known among the populace as Doña Virtudes, María la Seca ("Mary the Curt One") and la institutriz ("the governess"). She displayed strong religious beliefs which gained her the endorsement of Pope Leo XIII, weakening the adherence to Carlist stances within the clergy.

Her chief adviser and head of government was Práxedes Mateo Sagasta. Her rule is described as well-balanced and in accordance with respect for constitutional rights, and many political reforms were instated during her regency to prevent political conflicts and chaos. Her role was mostly ceremonial, and her purpose was to preserve the crown for her son until he became an adult.

Her spell as regent saw the loss of Cuba, Puerto Rico and the Philippines after the 1898 Spanish–American War.

Later life

After the marriage of her son with Victoria Eugenie of Battenberg in 1906, she took a secondary role in public events. Nevertheless, Alfonso XIII continued to look to her on many occasions for advice.

She was the leading figure around which the Germanophile stronghold within the Royal Court coalesced during World War I, in contrast to the pro-Entente minority faction represented by her daughter-in-law, the British-born Victoria Eugenie. Spain remained a neutral country during the conflict. 

She died on 6 February 1929, at the Royal Palace in Madrid, after some weeks of heart disease. She is buried at El Escorial. 

Sir Charles Petrie, Alfonso XIII's biographer, maintained that the Queen dowager's death had a disastrous effect on her son, and that the latter never recovered politically from the blow. Within little more than two years the monarchy had collapsed.

Titles and Styles
 21 July 1858 – 29 November 1879: Her Imperial and Royal Highness Archduchess Maria Christina of Austria, Princess Royal of Bohemia and Hungria
 29 November 1879 – 25 November 1885: Her Majesty The Queen of Spain
 25 November 1885 – 17 May 1902: Her Majesty The Queen Regent of Spain
 17 May 1902 – 6 February 1929: Her Majesty The Queen Mother of Spain

Honours
She received the following awards:

Heraldry

Ancestry

Bibliography

References
Informational notes

Citations

Sources

External links

 

1858 births
1929 deaths
Regents of Spain
House of Habsburg-Lorraine
Spanish royal consorts
19th-century women rulers
Queen mothers
19th-century Spanish people
20th-century Spanish people
Ladies of the Royal Order of Victoria and Albert
Austrian princesses
Grand Croix of the Légion d'honneur
Dames of the Order of Saint Isabel
Knights Grand Cross of the Order of the Immaculate Conception of Vila Viçosa
3
3
3
Grand Cordons of the Order of the Precious Crown
Burials in the Pantheon of Kings at El Escorial
Alfonso XII of Spain